Novy is a rural locality (a selo) in Beketovsky Selsoviet, Yermekeyevsky District, Bashkortostan, Russia. The population was 313 as of 2010. There are 2 streets.

Geography 
Novy is located 33 km southeast of Yermekeyevo (the district's administrative centre) by road. Priyutovo is the nearest rural locality.

References 

Rural localities in Yermekeyevsky District